In Sanatana Dharma,  (fulfillment, accomplishment) are material, paranormal, supernatural, or otherwise magical powers, abilities, and attainments that are the products of yogic advancement through sādhanās such as meditation and yoga. The term ṛddhi (Pali: iddhi, "psychic powers") is often used interchangeably in Buddhism.

Etymology
Siddhi is a Sanskrit noun which  can be translated as "knowledge", "accomplishment", "attainment", or "success".

Method
The Visuddhimagga is one of the texts to give explicit details about how spiritual masters were thought to actually manifest supernormal abilities. It states that abilities such as flying through the air, walking through solid obstructions, diving into the ground, walking on water and so forth are achieved through changing one element, such as earth, into another element, such as air. The individual must master kasina meditation before this is possible. Dipa Ma, who trained via the Visuddhimagga, was said to demonstrate these abilities.

Usage in Hinduism 
In the Panchatantra, an ancient Indian collection of moral fables, siddhi may be the term for any unusual skill or faculty or capability.

Patanjali's Yoga Sutras
In Patañjali's Yoga Sutras IV.1 it is stated, Janma auṣadhi mantra tapaḥ samādhijāḥ siddhayaḥ, "Accomplishments may be attained through birth, the use of herbs, incantations, self-discipline or samadhi".

Eight classical siddhis 
According to different sources, below are the eight classical siddhis (Ashta Siddhi) or eight great perfections are:
 Aṇimā: the ability to reduce one's body to the size of an atom.
 Mahimā: the ability to expand one's body to an infinitely large size..
 Laghimā: the ability to become weightless or lighter than air.
 “Garimā”: the ability to become heavy or dense
 Prāpti: the ability to access any place in the world.
 Prākāmya: the ability to realize whatever one desires.
 Īśiṭva: the ability to force influence upon anyone.
 Vaśiṭva: the ability to control all material elements or natural forces.

Shaivism
In Shaivism, siddhis are defined as "Extraordinary powers of the soul, developed through consistent meditation and often uncomfortable and grueling tapas, or awakened naturally through spiritual maturity and yogic sādhanā."

Vaishnavism
In Vaishnavism, the term siddhi is used in the Sarva-darśana-saṃgraha of Madhvacharya (1238–1317), the founder of Dvaita (dualist) philosophy.

Five siddhis, according to Vaishnava doctrine
In the Bhagavata Purana, the five siddhis brought on by yoga and meditation are:
 trikālajñatvam: knowing the past, present and future
 advandvam: tolerance of heat, cold and other dualities
 para citta ādi abhijñatā: knowing the minds of others, etc.
 agni arka ambu viṣa ādīnām pratiṣṭambhaḥ: checking the influence of fire, sun, water, poison, etc.
 aparājayah: remaining unconquered by others

Ten secondary siddhis, according to Vaishnava doctrine
In the Bhagavata Purana, Krishna describes the ten secondary siddhis:
 anūrmimattvam: Being undisturbed by hunger, thirst, and other bodily appetites
 dūraśravaṇa: Hearing things far away
 dūradarśanam: Seeing things far away
 manojavah: Moving the body wherever thought goes (teleportation/astral projection)
 kāmarūpam: Assuming any form desired
 parakāya praveśanam: Entering the bodies of others
 svachanda mṛtyuh: Dying when one desires
 devānām saha krīḍā anudarśanam: Witnessing and participating in the pastimes of the gods
 yathā saṅkalpa saṁsiddhiḥ: Perfect accomplishment of one's determination
 ājñāpratihatā gatiḥ: Orders or commands being unimpeded

Samkhya philosophy
In the Samkhyakarika and Tattvasamasa, there are references to the attainment of eight siddhis by which "one becomes free of the pain of ignorance, one gains knowledge, and experiences bliss".
The eight siddhis hinted at by Kapila in the Tattvasamasa are, as explained in verse 51 of the Samkhyakarika:
 Uuha:  based on the samskaras (karmic imprints) of previous births, the attainment of knowledge about the twenty-four tattvas gained by examining the determinable and indeterminable, conscious and non-conscious constituents of creation.
 Shabda: knowledge gained by associating with an enlightened person (Guru – upadesh).
 Addhyyan: knowledge gained through study of the Vedas and other standard ancillary texts.
 Suhritprapti: knowledge gained from a kind-hearted person, while engaged in the spread of knowledge.
 Daan: knowledge gained regardless of one’s own needs while attending to the requirements of those engaged in the search of the highest truth.
 Aadhyaatmik dukkh-haan:  freedom from pain, disappointment, etc. that may arise due to lack of spiritual, metaphysical, mystic knowledge and experience.
 Aadhibhautik dukkh-haan: freedom from pain etc. arising from possessing and being attached to various materialistic gains.
 Aadhidaivik dukkh-haan: freedom from pain etc. caused by fate or due to reliance on fate.

It is believed that the attainment of these eight siddhis renders one free of the pain of ignorance, and gives one knowledge and bliss.

Hindu deities associated with gaining siddhi
Ganesha, Hanuman, various forms of Devi, Vishnu and various other deities are popularly seen as the keepers of siddhis, with the ability to grant them to the worshipper.

Usage in Sikhism
In Sikhism, siddhi means "insight". "Eight Siddhis" is used for insight of the eight qualities of Nirankar or a.k.a. Akal Purakh mentioned in the Mul Mantar in the Guru Granth Sahib. God has eight qualities: EkOnkar, Satnam, Kartapurakh, Nirbhao, Nirvair, AkaalMurat, Ajooni and Svaibhang. The one who has insight of these qualities is called Sidh or Gurmukh.

1. EkOnkar: There is one formless GOD.
2. Satnam: GOD is true. His remembrance is true.
3. Kartapurakh: GOD alone is creator. 
4. Nirbhao: GOD is fearless.
5. Nirvair: GOD has enmity with none.
6. AkaalMurat: Beyond the life and death.
7. Ajooni Svaibhang: GOD is beyond the cycle of birth and death. 

Sidh means the one who has mastered his self.

Usage in Vajrayana Buddhism
In Tantric Buddhism, siddhi specifically refers to the acquisition of supernatural powers by psychic or magical means or the supposed faculty so acquired. These powers include items such as clairvoyance, levitation, bilocation and astral projection, materialization, and having access to memories from past lives.

See also
Karamat
Pranahuti

Notes

References

Sources

Further reading
 Bhagavata Purana

Yoga concepts
Hindu philosophical concepts
Tantric practices